Hapoel Sandala Gilboa), is an Israeli football club based in Sandala, in the Gilboa Regional Council. The club is currently in Liga Bet North B division.

History
The club was founded in 2011 and joined Liga Gimel Jerzreel division. In 2013–14, the club finished second in the division, after completing the season without losing a match, and was promoted to Liga Bet North B division, when a vacancy became available. The club finished its first season in Liga Bet in 9th place.

In the cup, the club won the divisional cup in 2012–13, advancing to the sixth round, where it lost to Sektzia Ma'alot-Tashiha.

Honours

Cups

External links
Hapoel Football Club Sandala Gilboa  Israel Football Association

References

Football clubs in Israel
Hapoel football clubs
Association football clubs established in 2011
2011 establishments in Israel
Arab-Israeli football clubs